Vallejos may refer to:

Vallejos (surname), including a list of people with the name
Vallejos v. Commissioner of Registration, 2011 right of abode case in Hong Kong

See also

 Vallejo (disambiguation)